Michael Bracewell (born 14 February 1991) is a New Zealand cricketer who plays for Wellington. He is the nephew of former Test players Brendon and John Bracewell, and the cousin of current international player Doug Bracewell and comedian Melanie Bracewell . He attended Kavanagh College in Dunedin. He made his international debut for the New Zealand cricket team in March 2022.

Career
In June 2018, he was awarded a contract with Wellington for the 2018–19 season. In March 2020, in round six of the 2019–20 Plunket Shield season, Bracewell took his maiden five-wicket haul in first-class cricket.

In June 2020, he was offered a contract by Wellington ahead of the 2020–21 domestic cricket season. On 8 January 2022, in the 2021–22 Super Smash tournament, Bracewell scored 141 not out for the Wellington Firebirds against the Central Stags. It was the highest score in a Twenty20 cricket match in New Zealand.

In March 2022, Bracewell was named in New Zealand's One Day International (ODI) and Twenty20 International (T20I) squads for their home series against the Netherlands. He made his ODI debut on 29 March 2022, for New Zealand against the Netherlands. In May 2022, Bracewell was named in New Zealand's Test squad for their tour of England. He made his Test debut on 10 June 2022, for New Zealand against England.

In July 2022, in the first match of the series against Ireland, Bracewell scored his first century in ODI cricket. Bracewell made his T20I debut on 18 July 2022, for New Zealand against Ireland. Two days later, in the next match of the series against Ireland, Bracewell took his first hat-trick in T20I cricket in the first over he bowled in an international match.

In January 2023, Bracewell scored third fastest century for New Zealand in ODI cricket while batting in the first match of the series against India. He also equalled MS Dhoni record of being the only batter to score more than one century while batting at number seven or below.

References

External links
 

1991 births
Living people
New Zealand cricketers
New Zealand Test cricketers
New Zealand One Day International cricketers
New Zealand Twenty20 International cricketers
Twenty20 International hat-trick takers
Otago cricketers
Wellington cricketers
Cricketers from Masterton
Michael